A Sense of Humour is a Canadian crime comedy film, directed by Émile Gaudreault and released in 2011. The film stars Louis-José Houde and Benoît Brière as Luc Dubé and Marco Fortier, two stand-up comedians who are kidnapped by Roger Gendron (Michel Côté) after making fun of him in a comedy show, and must protect themselves from his revenge by teaching him the art of comedy.

The cast also includes Anne Dorval, Sonia Vachon, Pierrette Robitaille, Alexandre Goyette and Pierre Collin.

The film opened in theatres in July 2011.
 
The film received four Jutra Award nominations at the 14th Jutra Awards in 2012, for Best Supporting Actress (Vachon), Best Cinematography (Bernard Couture), Best Editing (Jean-François Bergeron) and Best Original Music (FM Le Sieur).

References

External links

2011 films
Canadian crime comedy films
Films shot in Quebec
Films set in Quebec
Films directed by Émile Gaudreault
French-language Canadian films
2010s Canadian films